Chester Franklin "Buster" Ross (March 11, 1903 – April 24, 1982) was a major league baseball player for the Boston Red Sox from 1924 to 1926. He was born on March 11, 1903, in Kuttawa, Kentucky, and died on April 24, 1982, in Mayfield, Kentucky.

Ross holds the modern major league record for most errors by a pitcher in one game with four.  He committed four errors on May 17, 1925, against the St. Louis Browns.

Ross also gave up Babe Ruth's 300th career home run; this was on September 8, 1925, at Fenway Park.  Ruth was the first major league player to hit 300 home runs.

References

Sources

Major League Baseball pitchers
Boston Braves players
Baseball players from Kentucky
1903 births
1982 deaths